Punta Martin is a mountain in Liguria, northern Italy, part of the Ligurian Apennines.  It is located in the province of Genoa. It lies at an altitude of 1001 metres.

Nature conservation 
The mountain and its surrounding area are part of a SIC (Site of Community Importance) called Praglia – Pracaban – M. Leco – P. Martin  (code: IT1331501).

References

Mountains of the Apennines
Mountains of Liguria
Martin
Natura 2000 in Italy